Stalwart is a hamlet in Saskatchewan.

Unincorporated communities in Saskatchewan
Big Arm No. 251, Saskatchewan